The 1946 Preston by-election was a parliamentary by-election held on 31 January 1946 for the British House of Commons constituency of Preston in Lancashire.  The seat had become vacant when the Labour Member of Parliament John Sunderland had died on 24 November 1945.  Sunderland had held the seat since the 1945 general election.

The Labour candidate, Edward Shackleton, held the seat for his party.

Results

See also
Preston (UK Parliament constituency)
Preston
1903 Preston by-election
1915 Preston by-election
1929 Preston by-election
1936 Preston by-election
1940 Preston by-election
2000 Preston by-election
List of United Kingdom by-elections

References

1946 elections in the United Kingdom
1946 in England
1940s in Lancashire
By-elections to the Parliament of the United Kingdom in Lancashire constituencies
Elections in Preston